Plinia espinhacensis is a species of plant in the family Myrtaceae. It is endemic to the Espinhaço Mountains in the state of Minas Gerais, Brazil. The tree was first described in 2010 and grows up to 5 metres tall.

References

espinhacensis
Crops originating from the Americas
Crops originating from Brazil
Tropical fruit
Endemic flora of Brazil
Fruits originating in South America
Cauliflory
Fruit trees
Berries
Plants described in 2010